The 2013 National was held from January 23 to 27 at the Port Hawkesbury Civic Centre in Port Hawkesbury, Nova Scotia. It was the third men's Grand Slam event of the 2012–13 curling season. The purse for the event was CAD$100,000. In the final, Jeff Stoughton defeated a struggling Mike McEwen with a score of 8–2 in six ends.

Teams
The teams are listed as follows:

Round-robin standings
Final round-robin standings

Round-robin results
All draw times are listed in Atlantic Standard Time (UTC-4).

Draw 1
Wednesday, January 23, 7:00 pm

Draw 2
Thursday, January 24, 9:00 am

Draw 3
Thursday, January 24, 12:30 pm

Draw 4
Thursday, January 24, 4:00 pm

Draw 5
Thursday, January 24, 8:00 pm

Draw 6
Friday, January 25, 9:00 am

Draw 7
Friday, January 25, 12:30 pm

Draw 8
Friday, January 25, 4:30 pm

Draw 9
Friday, January 25, 8:30 pm

Tiebreaker
Saturday, January 26, 10:30 am

Playoffs
The playoffs draw is listed as follows:

Quarterfinals
Saturday, January 26, 4:30 pm

Semifinals
Saturday, January 26, 8:30 pm

Final
Sunday, January 27, 2:30 pm

References

External links

The National
The National, 2013
2013 in Nova Scotia
The National (curling)
Inverness County, Nova Scotia